Olia Hercules (born 1984) is a London-based Ukrainian chef, food writer and food stylist. In response to the 2022 Russian invasion of Ukraine she initiated a programme of fundraising, for individuals and for UNICEF.

Early life 
Olia Hercules was born in Southern Ukraine in 1984, and spent her early childhood in the town of Kakhovka. She is of Russian and Bessarabian (Moldovan) origin. Her father is an entrepreneur and her mother a hotel manager. She moved to Cyprus at the age of 12 where the climate was deemed better for her asthma and went to an English school. She settled in the United Kingdom at the age of 18 to study international relations and Italian at Warwick University before getting masters in Russian language and culture. Beside her native Russian, she also speaks English, Italian and some Ukrainian.

Work 
Hercules began working as a film journalist but amidst the 2008 economic crisis decided to change careers. Olia Hercules began working as a chef after completing a course at Leith's School of Food and Wine in 2010. She was then a food stylist for various publications,  after which she went on to work at London restaurant Ottolenghi's as a chef-de-partie (line cook).

Hercules has appeared on Saturday Kitchen, Sunday Brunch, and Christopher Kimball's Milk Street Television.

Books 
She has written the recipe book Mamushka which is a collection of Eastern European recipes. 2017 saw Hercules' second book published.
 Mamushka: Recipes From Ukraine & Beyond  (Octopus Publishing, 2015)
 Kaukasis: The Cookbook – A Journey Through the Wild East (Octopus Publishing, 2017)
 Summer Kitchens Inside Ukraine's Hidden Places of Cooking and Sanctuary (Weldon Owen, July 14, 2020)
 Home Food (Bloomsbury Publishing, 7 July 2022)

Activism 
In response to the 2022 Russian invasion of Ukraine, Hercules raised money to privately send bullet-proof vests to civilian volunteers in the Ukrainian army, including her brother. With her friend, the Russian chef Alissa Timoshkina, the duo established the #CookForUkraine social media initiative, encouraging businesses and individuals to raise money for UNICEF by cooking Ukrainian cuisine.

Awards 
 The Observer Rising Star in Food 2015
 Winner of Fortnum & Mason's Debut Food Book Award 2016

Personal life 
She married a Greek-Cypriot man in her early twenties and kept his last name ‘Hercules’. She then had a son with fellow chef Tom Catley and is now married to food photographer Joe Woodhouse. The couple have two sons and live in London.

References

External links
 Olia Hercules website
 Recipe collection on BBC Food
 Olia Hercule's Guardian profile

1984 births
Living people
Food writers
The Guardian journalists
Ukrainian chefs
Ukrainian people of Russian descent
Ukrainian expatriates in England
Ukrainian writers